Latika (Hindi: लतिका) is a Hindu/Sanskrit Indian feminine given name, which means "goddess".

Notable people named Latika 
 Latika Bourke (born 1984), Australian author and journalist
 Latika Katt (born 1948), Indian sculptor
 Latika Kumari (born 1992), Indian cricketer
 Letika Saran (1952-2014), Indian police office
 Lathika Shetty (1986), CEO

Fictional characters 
 Latika from Danny Boyle's 2008 British Oscar-winning movie, Slumdog Millionaire

See also 
Lata (disambiguation)
Latha (disambiguation)

Indian feminine given names
Hindu given names